The Eric Gregory Award is a literary award given annually by the Society of Authors for a collection by British poets under the age of 30. The award was founded in 1960 by Dr. Eric Gregory to support and encourage young poets. In 2021, the seven winners were: Michael Askew; Dominic Hand; Cynthia Miller; Gboyega Odubanjo; Kandance Siobhan Walker; Phoebe Walker; and Milena Williamson.

Past winners

1960: Christopher Levenson
1961: Adrian Mitchell, Geoffrey Hill
1962: Donald Thomas, James Simmons, Bryan Johnson, Jenny Joseph
1963: Ian Hamilton, Stewart Conn, Peter Griffith, David Wevill
1964: Robert Nye, Ken Smith, Jean Symons, Ted Walker
1965: John Fuller, Derek Mahon, Michael Longley, Norman Talbot
1966: Robin Fulton, Seamus Heaney, Hugo Williams
1967: Angus Calder, Marcus Cumberlege, David Harsent, David Selzer, Brian Patten
1968: James Aitchison, Douglas Dunn, Brian Jones
1969: Gavin Bantock, Jeremy Hooker, Jenny King, Neil Powell, Landeg E. White, Glen Rybertt
1970: Helen Frye, Paul Mills, John Mole, Brian Morse, Alan Perry, Richard Tibbitts
1971: Martin Booth, Florence Bull, John Pook, D. M. Warman, John Welch
1972: Tony Curtis, Richard Berengarten, Brian Oxley, Andrew Greig, Robin Lee, Paul Muldoon
1973: John Beynon, Ian Caws, James Fenton, Keith Harris, David Howarth, Philip Pacey
1974: Duncan Forbes, Roger Garfitt, Robin Hamilton, Frank Ormsby, Penelope Shuttle
1975: John Birtwhistle, Duncan Bush, Val Warner, Philip Holmes, Peter Cash, Alasdair Paterson
1976: Stewart Brown, Valerie Gillies, Paul Groves, Paul Hyland, Nigel Jenkins, Andrew Motion, Tom Paulin, William Peskett
1977: Tony Flynn, Michael Vince, David Cooke, Douglas Marshall, Melissa Murray
1978: Ciaran Carson, Peter Denman, Christopher Reid, Paul Wilkins, Martyn A. Ford, James Sutherland-Smith
1979: Stuart Henson, Michael Jenkins, Alan Hollinghurst, Sean O'Brien, Peter Thabit Jones, James Lindesay, Walter Perrie, Brian Moses
1980: Robert Minhinnick, Michael Hulse, Blake Morrison, Medbh McGuckian
1981: Alan Jenkins, Simon Rae, Marion Lomax, Philip Gross, Kathleen Jamie, Mark Abley, Roger Crowley, Ian Gregson
1982: Steve Ellis, Jeremy Reed, Alison Brackenbury, Neil Astley, Chris O'Neill, Joseph Bristow, John Gibbens, James Lasdun
1983: Martin Stokes, Hilary Davies, Michael O'Neill, Lisa St Aubin De Teran, Deidre Shanahan
1984: Martyn Crucefix, Mick Imlah, Jamie McKendrick, Bill Smith, Carol Ann Duffy, Christopher Meredith, Peter Armstrong, Iain Bamforth
1985: Graham Mort, Adam Thorpe, Pippa Little, James Harpur, Simon North, Julian May
1986: Mick North, Lachlan Mackinnon, Oliver Reynolds, Stephen Romer
1987: Peter McDonald, Maura Dooley, Stephen Knight, Steve Anthony, Jill Maughan, Paul Munden
1988: Michael Symmons Roberts, Gwyneth Lewis, Adrian Blackledge, Simon Armitage, Robert Crawford
1989: Gerard Woodward, David Morley, Katrina Porteous, Paul Henry
1990: Nicholas Drake, Maggie Hannan, William Park, Jonathan Davidson, Lavinia Greenlaw, Don Paterson, John Wells
1991: Roddy Lumsden, Glyn Maxwell, Stephen Smith, Wayne Burrows, Jackie Kay
1992: Jill Dawson, Hugh Dunkerley, Chris Greenhalgh, Marita Maddah, Stuart Paterson, Stuart Pickford
1993: Eleanor Brown, Joel Lane, Deryn Rees-Jones, Sean Boustead, Tracey Herd, Angela McSeveney
1994: Julia Copus, Alice Oswald, Steven Blyth,  Kate Clanchy, Giles Goodland
1995: Colette Bryce, Sophie Hannah, Tobias Hill, Mark Wormald
1996: Sue Butler, Cathy Cullis, Jane Griffiths, Jane Holland, Chris Jones, Sinéad Morrissey, Kate Thomas
1997: Matthew Clegg, Sarah Corbett, Polly Clark, Tim Kendall, Graham Nelson, Matthew Welton
1998: Mark Goodwin, Joanne Limburg, Patrick McGuinness, Kona Macphee, Esther Morgan, Christiania Whitehead, Frances Williams
1999: Ross Cogan, Matthew Hollis, Helen Ivory, Andrew Pidoux, Owen Sheers, Dan Wyke
2000: Eleanor Margolies, Antony Rowland, Antony Dunn, Karen Goodwin, Clare Pollard
2001: Leontia Flynn, Thomas Warner, Tishani Doshi, Patrick Mackie, Kathryn Gray, Sally Read
2002: Caroline Bird, Christopher James, Jacob Polley, Luke Heeley, Judith Lal, David Leonard Briggs, Eleanor Rees, Kathryn Simmonds
2003: Jen Hadfield, Zoë Brigley, Paul Batchelor, Olivia Cole, Sasha Dugdale, Anna Woodford
2004: Nick Laird, Elizabeth Manuel, Abi Curtis, Sophie Levy, Saradha Soobrayen
2005: Melanie Challenger, Carolyn Jess-Cooke, Luke Kennard, Jaim Smith
2006: Fiona Benson, Retta Bowen, Frances Leviston, Jonathan Morley, Eoghan Walls
2007: Rachel Curzon, Miriam Gamble, Michael McKimm, Helen Mort, Jack Underwood
2008: Emily Berry, Rhiannon Hooson, James Midgley, Adam O'Riordan, Heather Phillipson
2009: Liz Berry, James Brookes, Swithun Cooper, Alex McRae, Sam Riviere
2010: Phil Brown, Matthew Gregory, Sarah Howe, Abigail Parry, Ahren Warner
2011: Niall Campbell, Tom Chivers, Holly Hopkins, Martin Jackson, Kim Moore
2012: Sophie Baker, Joey Connolly, Holly Corfield Carr, Caleb Klaces, Rachael Nicholas, Phoebe Power, Jon Stone
2013: John Clegg, Kate Gething-Smith, Matt Haw, Oli Hazzard
2014: Sophie Collins, Emily Hasler, Martha Sprackland, Chloe Stopa-Hunt, David Tait
2015: Rowan Evans, Miriam Nash, Padraig Regan, Stewart Sanderson, Andrew Wynn Owen
2016: Sam Buchan Watts, Dom Bury, Jen Campbell, Alex MacDonald, Andrew McMillan
2017: Rachael Allen, Isabel Galleymore, Daisy Lafarge, Richard O'Brien, Richard Osmond, Mark Pajak
2018: Zohar Atkins, Victoria Adukwei Bulley, Jenna Clake, Joseph Eastell, Annie Katchinska, Ali Lewis, Stephen Sexton
2019: James Conor Patterson, Sophie Collins, Mary Jean Chan, Dominic Leonard, Seán Hewitt, Phoebe Stuckes
2020: Susannah Dickey, Natalie Linh Bolderston, Roseanne Watt, Kadish Morris, Amina Jama
2021: Michael Askew, Dominic Hand, Cynthia Miller, Gboyega Odubanjo, Kandance Siobhan Walker, Phoebe Walker, Milena Williamson
2022: Stephanie Sy-Quia, Daniella Fearon, Jack Cooper, Maisie Newman, Courtney Conrad, Rhiya Pau, Joe Carrick-Varty

See also
List of British literary awards
British poetry
List of poetry awards
List of years in poetry
List of years in literature

References

External links 
Eric Gregory Award, official website at Society of Authors website.
Past winners, complete list.

British poetry awards
Society of Authors awards
Awards established in 1960
1960 establishments in the United Kingdom
Literary awards honoring writers
Literary awards honouring young writers